Village Park was a census-designated place (CDP) in Honolulu County, Hawaii, United States. The population was 9,625 at the 2000 census. For the 2010 census, it was replaced by the Royal Kunia CDP.

Geography
Village Park is located at  (21.396719, -158.029444).

Demographics
As of the census of 2000, there were 9,625 people, 2,628 households, and 2,281 families residing in the CDP. The racial makeup of the CDP was 9.36% White, 2.24% African American, 0.25% Native American, 57.90% Asian, 7.57% Pacific Islander, 1.22% from other races, and 21.45% from two or more races. Hispanic or Latino of any race were 7.09% of the population.

There were 2,628 households, out of which 49.8% had children under the age of 18 living with them, 70.9% were married couples living together, 10.5% had a female householder with no husband present, and 13.2% were non-families. 8.3% of all households were made up of individuals, and 0.5% had someone living alone who was 65 years of age or older.  The average household size was 3.66 and the average family size was 3.87.

In the CDP the population was spread out, with 30.4% under the age of 18, 10.1% from 18 to 24, 32.3% from 25 to 44, 21.9% from 45 to 64, and 5.3% who were 65 years of age or older.  The median age was 31 years. For every 100 females, there were 101.1 males.  For every 100 females age 18 and over, there were 97.7 males.

The median income for a household in the CDP was $70,302, and the median income for a family was $72,422. Males had a median income of $35,317 versus $25,610 for females. The per capita income for the CDP was $19,579.  About 3.4% of families and 5.0% of the population were below the poverty line, including 6.5% of those under age 18 and 1.7% of those age 65 or over.

Education
Hawaii Department of Education operates public schools. Kale'iopu'u Elementary School is in the former Village Park CDP.

References

Populated places on Oahu